Prinos may refer to the following villages in Greece:
 Prinos, Thasos, on the island of Thasos
Prinos oil field off the coast of Thasos